Anthocomus equestris is a species of soft-winged flower beetle in the family Melyridae. It is native to Eurasia, but also found in the eastern half of the United States.

References

External links

 

Melyridae